Range Courage is a 1927 American silent Western film directed by Ernst Laemmle and starring Fred Humes,  Gloria Grey and Dick Winslow.

Cast
 Fred Humes as Lem Gallagher
 Gloria Grey as Betty Martin
 Dick Winslow as Jimmy Blake
 William Steele as Tex Lucas 
 Robert Homans as Pop Gallagher
 Arthur Millett as John Martin
 Monte Montague as Bart Allan
 Charles King as Red Murphy
 Morgan Brown as Sheriff

References

Bibliography
 Connelly, Robert B. The Silents: Silent Feature Films, 1910-36, Volume 40, Issue 2. December Press, 1998.
 Langman, Larry. A Guide to Silent Westerns. Greenwood Publishing Group, 1992.
 Munden, Kenneth White. The American Film Institute Catalog of Motion Pictures Produced in the United States, Part 1. University of California Press, 1997.

External links
 

1927 films
1927 Western (genre) films
American silent feature films
American Western (genre) films
Films directed by Ernst Laemmle
American black-and-white films
Universal Pictures films
1920s English-language films
1920s American films